Howard K. Walker (born August 5, 1958) is a Canadian former ice hockey defenceman who played for the Washington Capitals and Calgary Flames. Originally signed by the Capitals as a free agent in 1980, Walker played parts of two seasons there before he was traded to the Flames. He retired following the 1982–83 NHL season.

Awards and honours

References

External links

1958 births
Living people
AHCA Division I men's ice hockey All-Americans
Calgary Flames players
Canadian ice hockey defencemen
Hershey Bears players
Ice hockey people from Alberta
North Dakota Fighting Hawks men's ice hockey players
Penticton Vees players
People from Grande Prairie
Undrafted National Hockey League players
Washington Capitals players
NCAA men's ice hockey national champions